The Scottish Canoe Association is the national governing body for canoeing, kayaking and other paddlesport in Scotland.

It covers all branches of the sport from recreational activities to canoe slalom; wildwater racing; flatwater sprint racing and marathon racing; canoe sailing; canoe polo; surf kayaking and canoeing; and extreme racing (including the international event on the Glen Nevis in Lochaber).

It was founded in 1939 by four canoe clubs, the Canoe Section of the Camping Club, Clyde Canoe Club, Forth Canoe Club (1934) and Scottish Youth Hostels Canoe Club. The body now has approximately 3,000 individual members, including 1,750 qualified coaches, plus 90 affiliated clubs and associate organisations.

Performance 
In March 2019, SCA announced double Olympic medallist Jon Schofield as their Head of Performance & Pathways.

SCA Performance runs programmes in 2 Olympic disciplines, Sprint and Slalom canoeing. Rio 2016 saw the introduction of Paracanoe in the Paralympic programme and SCA aim to support the identification of Scottish athletes to join the British Canoeing Programme centrally delivered in Nottingham High Performance Centre.

Disciplines 
There is a diverse range of different disciplines covered by Scottish Canoe Association. Along with the traditional competitive disciplines (including the two Olympic disciplines of Sprint and Slalom) there are several recreational disciplines:

Regional development 
SCA have 9 regions in Scotland. They are Borders, Central, Fife, Tayside, Grampian and Shetland, HIghlands and Islands, Lothians, South West and West.

Each region has its own Regional Officer, whose purpose is to:

 Support the delivery of SCA strategy within the region
 Act as a regional contact for SCA members, affiliated clubs and centres linking them to SCA volunteers, committees and staff as appropriate
 Support SCA coaching and development work in the region
 Represent the SCA Coaching Service within the region
 Be a regional ambassador for SCA and British Canoeing

Governance 
The SCA Board is responsible for high-level planning, governance, and compliance with legislation. SCA Committees deal with specific paddling development and planning and therefore play a key role in the delivery of SCA activities. The Board and Committees are strongly supported by employed staff in areas of Coaching & Development, Performance and Administration.

References 

Sports organizations established in 1939
Canoeing
Sport in Edinburgh
1939 establishments in Scotland
Canoe organizations
Kayaking
Paddleboarders
Canoe polo